Martin Heydon (born 9 August 1978) is an Irish Fine Gael politician who has served as Minister of State at the Department of Agriculture, Food and the Marine with responsibility for Research & Development, Farm Safety and New Market Development since July 2020. He has been a Teachta Dála (TD) for the Kildare South constituency since 2011. He previously served as the Chairman of the Fine Gael Parliamentary Party from 2016 to 2020.

Early life
Heydon is a native of South County Kildare and lives outside of Kilcullen town, owning a family farm. He was educated in Crookstown National School, Cross and Passion College Kilcullen and Teagasc Kildalton Agricultural College in County Kilkenny.

Political career
Heydon joined Fine Gael in 2008. He was elected to Kildare County Council following the 2009 local elections, at his first attempt. He was replaced on Kildare County Council following his Dáil Éireann election in February 2011, by Councillor Ivan Keatley.

Heydon contested Kildare South for the party in 2011 and polled over 12,000 votes, being elected on the first count, more than 3,000 votes over the quota, his first attempt in a general election. Fine Gael had been unrepresented in the constituency since Alan Dukes had lost his seat in 2002.

He served as Chair of Fine Gael's Internal Committee on Agriculture and Rural Affairs between 2011 and 2016.

Newbridge Fine Gael Councillor Fiona McLoughlin Healy was added to the ticket for the 2016 general election as his running mate. Heydon won re-election, topping the poll in Kildare South.

On 8 June 2016, Heydon was elected Chairman of the Fine Gael Parliamentary Party, succeeding retired Limerick TD Dan Neville. Heydon's responsibilities in this role included chairing the weekly meeting of the party's TDs, Senators and MEPs.

Following the formation of the Government of the 33rd Dáil, Heydon was appointed Minister of State at the Department of Agriculture, Food and the Marine.

Personal life 
Heydon is married to pharmacist and former ladies' GAA All-Star Brianne Leahy. The couple have three sons and a daughter.

He is an officer of his local Gaelic football club, St Laurence's GAA.

References

External links

Martin Heydon's page on the Fine Gael website

1978 births
Living people
Fine Gael TDs
Irish farmers
Local councillors in County Kildare
Members of the 31st Dáil
Members of the 32nd Dáil
Members of the 33rd Dáil
Politicians from County Kildare
Ministers of State of the 33rd Dáil